Tetralonia malvae, also known as the Mallow longhorn, is a species of insect belonging to the family Apidae. The bee takes pollen from oligolectic sources on the  mallow family (Malvaceae).

Behaviour  
They generally nest on bare or sparsely overgrown ground, even to heavily sloping surfaces, or in steep walls in self-dug corridors in the earth, often in aggregations. The preferred substrate is sand, loess or loess clay. The nest consists of a corridor that can branch out. The brood cells are more or less upright and are inside with a shiny layer coated. The species inhabits dry and warm locations; vineyards, fallow and ruderal areas, sand and clay pits, steep banks, from plains to the montane altitude level.

Parasitism 
They are parasitised by the cuckoo bee species Triepeolus tristis. Another nest parasite is a bladder-head fly of the genus Conops.

Flight period 
They can be seen in one generation from June to August.

Distribution 
The species is found from Spain, across southern and central Europe, southern Russia, Asia Minor and Caucasus to Central Asia; north to Lithuania and Orenburg; south to Sicily, Crete, Syria, Iraq and Northern Iran.

References

Apidae